Boca Juniors Football Club is a Grenadian football club from The Bocas neighborhood of St. George's, Grenada. The club plays in the Grenada Premier Division.

References

Boca Juniors